1955 in sports describes the year's events in world sport.

American football
 NFL Championship: the Cleveland Browns won 38–14 over the Los Angeles Rams at the Los Angeles Memorial Coliseum
 Rose Bowl (1954 season):
 The Ohio State Buckeyes win 20–7 over the Southern California Trojans to win the AP Poll national championship

Association football

England
 First Division – Chelsea win the 1954–55 title
 FA Cup – Newcastle United beat Manchester City 3-1

Peru
 Sporting Cristal was founded.

Athletics
 March 12 to 16 – Athletics at the 1955 Pan American Games in Mexico City

Australian rules football
 Victorian Football League
 Melbourne wins the 59th VFL Premiership, defeating Collingwood 8.16 (64) to 5.6 (36) in the Grand Final.
 Brownlow Medal awarded to Fred Goldsmith (South Melbourne)
 South Australian National Football League
 April 30: West Torrens 9.12 (66) draws Norwood 8.18 (66) at Thebarton Oval. It is the first senior SANFL drawn match since West Adelaide 15.14 (104) drew with Port Adelaide 16.8 (104) on 24 May 1941. The intervening 788-game gap constitutes easily the longest non-occurrence of draws in SANFL history and is twice as long as the V/AFL or VFA record, but has been bettered twice in the WAFL.
 October 1: Port Adelaide 15.11 (101) defeats Norwood 5.8 (38) for their second consecutive premiership
 West Australian Football League
 October 8: Perth 11.11 (77) defeat East Fremantle 11.9 (75) for their first premiership since 1907 in champion ruckman Merv McIntosh's final match.

Bandy
 Federation of International Bandy inaugurated at Stockholm by Finland, Norway, Sweden and the USSR.  The Soviet Union now adopts the international rules of the game developed in England in the 19th century.

Baseball
 Philadelphia Athletics move to Kansas City, Missouri and become the Kansas City Athletics
 April 23 – The White Sox tally a franchise record 29 runs at Kansas City. Sherm Lollar is 5-for-6 with a pair of home runs and five RBI, while reserve outfielder Bob Nieman and infielder Walt Dropo drive in seven runs apiece, and Chico Carrasquel hits 5-for-6 with five runs in the 29–6 victory over the Athletics
 World Series – October 4 – The Brooklyn Dodgers win 4 games to 3 over the New York Yankees; Series MVP is pitcher Johnny Podres, Brooklyn

Basketball
 NCAA Men's Basketball Championship – San Francisco wins 76–73 over La Salle
 NBA Finals – The Syracuse Nationals beat the Fort Wayne Pistons 4 games to 3 to win the NBA title
 Eurobasket 1955, the ninth European basketball championship, is won by Hungary
 March 1 – Allen Fieldhouse opens at the University of Kansas as the Jayhawks defeat Kansas State
 Bayi Basketball Club, officially founded in Ningbo, Zhejiang Province.(as predecessor for Bayi Rockets, as known well for professional basketball club in China)
 Brose Bamberg was founded in Bavaria, Germany.

Boxing
 March 12 to 16 – Boxing at the 1955 Pan American Games in Mexico City
 September 21 – In New York City, Rocky Marciano knocks out the light-heavyweight champion Archie Moore in the 9th round to retain his World Heavyweight Championship belt

Bowling
Nine-pin bowling
 Nine-pin bowling World Championships –
 Men's champion: Eberhard Luther, East Germany
 Women's champion: Franciška Erjavec, Yugoslavia
 Men's team champion: East Germany
 Women's team champion: East Germany

Canadian football
 Grey Cup – Edmonton Eskimos won 34–19 over the Montreal Alouettes

Cycling
 Giro d'Italia won by Fiorenzo Magni of Italy
 Tour de France – Louison Bobet of France
 UCI Road World Championships – Men's road race – Stan Ockers of Belgium

Figure skating
 World Figure Skating Championships –
 Men's champion: Hayes Alan Jenkins, United States
 Ladies' champion: Tenley Albright, United States
 Pair skating champions: Frances Dafoe & Norris Bowden, Canada
 Ice dancing champions: Jean Westwood & Lawrence Demmy, Great Britain

Golf
Men's professional
 Masters Tournament – Cary Middlecoff
 U.S. Open – Jack Fleck
 British Open – Peter Thomson
 PGA Championship – Doug Ford
 PGA Tour money leader – Julius Boros – $63,122
 Ryder Cup – United States team wins 8–4 over the British team.
Men's amateur
 British Amateur – Joe Conrad
 U.S. Amateur – Harvie Ward
Women's professional
 The LPGA launches the new LPGA Championship annual tournament.
 Women's Western Open – Patty Berg
 LPGA Championship – Beverly Hanson
 U.S. Women's Open – Fay Crocker
 Titleholders Championship – Patty Berg
 LPGA Tour money leader – Patty Berg – $16,492

Harness racing
 The first Cane Pace is held at Yonkers Raceway.
 Little Brown Jug for pacers won by Quick Chief
 Cane Pace won by Quick Chief
 The United States Trotting Triple Crown races are established. Scott Frost will win the first ever crown.
 Hambletonian – Scott Frost
 Yonkers Trot – Scott Frost
 Kentucky Futurity – Scott Frost
 Australian Inter Dominion Harness Racing Championship –
 Pacers: Tactician
 Trotters: Battle Cry

Horse racing
 August 31 – In one of the most famous match races in thoroughbred racing history, Nashua beats Swaps at Washington Park racetrack, Swaps only loss in nine starts as a three-year-old. Nashua's owner-breeder, William Woodward, Jr., dreams of owning a Derby winner, and plans to send Nashua to England to train toward that goal but is shot dead by his wife on October 31 before he can proceed.
Steeplechases
 Cheltenham Gold Cup – Gay Donald
 Grand National – Quare Times
Flat races
 Australia – Melbourne Cup won by Toparoa
 Canada – Queen's Plate won by Ace Marine
 France – Prix de l'Arc de Triomphe won by Ribot
 Ireland – Irish Derby Stakes won by Panaslipper
 English Triple Crown Races:
 2,000 Guineas Stakes – Our Babu
 The Derby – Phil Drake
 St. Leger Stakes – Meld
 United States Triple Crown Races:
 Kentucky Derby – Swaps
 Preakness Stakes – Nashua
 Belmont Stakes – Nashua

Ice hockey
 Art Ross Trophy as the NHL's leading scorer during the regular season: Bernie "Boom-Boom" Geoffrion, Montreal Canadiens
 Hart Memorial Trophy for the NHL's Most Valuable Player: Ted Kennedy, Toronto Maple Leafs
 Stanley Cup – Detroit Red Wings win 4 games to 3 over the Montreal Canadiens
 World Hockey Championship – Men's champion: Canada's Penticton Vees win 5–0 over the USSR
 NCAA Men's Ice Hockey Championship – University of Michigan Wolverines defeat Colorado College Tigers 5–3 in Colorado Springs

Motorsport

Rugby league
1955–56 European Rugby League Championship
1955 New Zealand rugby league season
1955 NSWRFL season
1954–55 Northern Rugby Football League season / 1955–56 Northern Rugby Football League season

Rugby union
 61st Five Nations Championship series is shared by France and Wales

Snooker
 World Snooker Championship – Fred Davis beats John Pulman 37-34

Tennis
Australia
 Australian Men's Singles Championship – Ken Rosewall (Australia) defeats Lew Hoad (Australia) 9–7, 6–4, 6–4
 Australian Women's Singles Championship – Beryl Penrose Collier (Australia) defeats Thelma Coyne Long (Australia) 6–4, 6–3
England
 Wimbledon Men's Singles Championship – Tony Trabert (USA) defeats Kurt Nielsen (Denmark) 6–3, 7–5, 6–1
 Wimbledon Women's Singles Championship – Louise Brough Clapp (USA) defeats Beverly Baker Fleitz (USA) 7–5, 8–6
France
 French Men's Singles Championship – Tony Trabert (USA) defeats Sven Davidson (Sweden) 2–6, 6–1, 6–4, 6–2
 French Women's Singles Championship – Angela Mortimer (Great Britain) defeats Dorothy Head Knode (USA) 2–6, 7–5, 10–8
USA
 American Men's Singles Championship – Tony Trabert (USA) defeats Ken Rosewall (USA) 9–7, 6–3, 6–3
 American Women's Singles Championship – Doris Hart (USA) defeats Patricia Ward Hales (Great Britain) 6–4, 6–2
Davis Cup
 1955 Davis Cup –  5–0  at West Side Tennis Club (grass) New York City, United States

Volleyball
 March 16 to 20 – Volleyball at the 1955 Pan American Games in Mexico City
 Men's Tournament
 Gold Medal: USA
 Silver Medal: Mexico
 Bronze Medal: Brazil
 Women's Tournament
 Gold Medal: Mexico
 Silver Medal: USA
 Bronze Medal: Brazil

Multi-sport events
 Second Pan American Games held in Mexico City, Mexico
 Second Mediterranean Games held in Barcelona, Spain

Awards
 Associated Press Male Athlete of the Year – Howard "Hopalong" Cassady, College football
 Associated Press Female Athlete of the Year – Patty Berg, LPGA golf

References

 
Sports by year